The 2013 Trofeul Popeci was a professional tennis tournament played on outdoor clay courts. It was the seventh edition of the tournament which was part of the 2013 ITF Women's Circuit, offering a total of $50,000+H in prize money. It took place in Craiova, Romania, on 12–18 August 2013.

Singles entrants

Seeds 

 1 Rankings as of 5 August 2013

Other entrants 
The following players received wildcards into the singles main draw:
  Elena Bogdan
  Ioana Ducu
  Camelia Hristea
  Ioana Loredana Roșca

The following players received entry from the qualifying draw:
  Alice Balducci
  Martina Caregaro
  Inés Ferrer Suárez
  Lisa-Maria Moser

The following player received entry by a Junior Exempt:
  Ana Konjuh

Champions

Women's singles 

  Kristína Kučová def.  Alberta Brianti 7–5, 3–6, 6–4

Women's doubles 

  Alice Balducci /  Katarzyna Kawa def.  Diana Buzean /  Christina Shakovets 3–6, 7–6(7–3), [10–8]

External links 
  
 2013 Trofeul Popeci at ITFtennis.com

2013 ITF Women's Circuit
2013 in Romanian tennis
Trofeul Popeci
August 2013 sports events in Romania